The Royal Society of British Artists (RBA) is a British art body established in 1823 as the Society of British Artists, as an alternative to the Royal Academy.

History
The RBA commenced with twenty-seven members, and took until 1876 to reach fifty. Artists wishing to resign were required to give three months' notice and pay a fine of £100. The RBA's first two exhibitions were held in 1824, with one or two exhibitions held annually thereafter.

The RBA currently has 115 elected members who participate in an annual exhibition currently held at the Mall Galleries in London. The Society's previous gallery was a building designed by John Nash in Suffolk Street. Queen Victoria granted the Society the Royal Charter in 1887.

It is one of the nine member societies that form the Federation of British Artists which administers the Mall Galleries, next to Trafalgar Square.

Its records from 1823 to 1985 are in the Victoria and Albert Museum.

Prominent members

Presidents

References

External links
Royal Society of British Artists

Art schools in London
British art
1823 establishments in the United Kingdom
Organisations based in London with royal patronage
Organizations established in 1823
Arts organizations established in the 1820s